Waldemar Kazanecki (born 29 April 1929 in Warsaw, Poland, died 20 December 1991 in Warsaw) was a Polish pianist, conductor and composer.

Life and career
Waldemar Kazanecki began as a music editor on Polish Radio Katowice in 1954 and later became a pianist in the Jerzy Harald Orchestra. Kazanecki began composing for movies with the film Hrabina Cosel (The Countess Cosel) in 1966. In 1975 he produced the score for Nights and Days (Noce i Dnie), Jerzy Antczak's Academy Award-nominated film. In total, he composed for some 500 movies and television shows. Kazanecki died in Warsaw in 1991.

Selected works
 Czarne chmury (1973)
 Nie ma róży bez ognia (1974)
 Noce i dnie (1975)
 Brunet wieczorową porą (1976)
 Dom (1980)
 Bolek i Lolek
 Baśnie i waśnie
 Zaczarowany ołówek
 Ballada o Januszku (1987)
 Do przerwy 0:1 (1969)
 Gorzka miłość (1990)
 Hrabina Cosel (1968)
 Tylko Kaśka (1980)
 Muchy króla Apsika

References

External links
 

1929 births
1991 deaths
Polish composers
Polish film score composers
Male film score composers
Musicians from Warsaw
20th-century composers
20th-century male musicians